Michal Dopater (born 26 February 2001) is a Slovak professional footballer who currently plays as a midfielder for FK Humenné, on loan from MFK Ružomberok.

Club career

MFK Ružomberok
Dopater made his Fortuna Liga debut for Ružomberok against Nitra on 22 August 2020, replacing Štefan Gerec in the 2nd half.

References

External links
 MFK Ružomberok official club profile 
 
 Futbalnet profile 
 

2001 births
Living people
Slovak footballers
Association football midfielders
FC Petržalka players
MFK Ružomberok players
Partizán Bardejov players
FK Humenné players
Slovak Super Liga players
2. Liga (Slovakia) players